The Biblia Hebraica Stuttgartensia, abbreviated as BHS or rarely BH4, is an edition of the Masoretic Text of the Hebrew Bible as preserved in the Leningrad Codex, and supplemented by masoretic and text-critical notes. It is the fourth edition in the Biblia Hebraica series started by Rudolf Kittel and is published by the Deutsche Bibelgesellschaft (German Bible Society) in Stuttgart.

Publishing history

BHS is a revision of the third edition of the Biblia Hebraica, edited by Paul Kahle, the first printed Bible based on the Leningrad Codex. The footnotes are completely revised.  It originally appeared in installments, from 1968 to 1976, with the first one-volume edition in 1977; it has been reprinted many times since.

The fifth reprint of the BHS was revised and redistributed in 1997.  Work is currently under way at the Deutsche Bibelgesellschaft to produce a completely reworked and expanded edition in 20 volumes, known as the Biblia Hebraica Quinta or Fifth Hebrew Bible, which also includes references to and comparisons with recently released material from Qumran texts. Initial volumes of the Bible Hebraica Quinta have been available for sale since 2004. Completion of the project is intended by 2020.

BHS Fascicles and editors

The work has been published in 15 fascicles from 1968 to 1976 according to this release schedule taken from the Latin prolegomena in the book.

The processing and development of the Masoretic annotations and notes within all editions of the Biblia Hebraica Stuttgartensia was the privilege of Gérard E. Weil. He also released the book Massorah Gedolah iuxta codicem Leningradensem B 19a at the Pontifical Biblical Institute in 1971, which is the very first Edition of the Masora Magna, what gives an idea of his unique expertise in relation to the Masora.

A print edition of the Leningrad Codex

The Biblia Hebraica Stuttgartensia is meant to be an exact copy of the Masoretic Text as recorded in the Leningrad Codex. According to the introductory prolegomena of the book, the editors have "accordingly refrained from removing obvious scribal errors" (these have then been noted in the critical apparatus). Diacritics like the Silluq and Meteg which were missing in the Leningrad Codex also have not been added.

The only exception to that is the Rafe diacritic which has been consistently omitted in the BHS due to "almost insuperable technical difficulties" with its implementation in the typeface. This is not untypical, since almost every Hebrew Bible print edition, starting with Jacob ben Chayyim's Bombergiana omits the diacritic (because of its minor importance; it serves as a pronunciation help and is partially redundant due to the Dagesh diacritic, the "opposite of the Rafe").

Like its predecessor the Biblia Hebraica Kittel the BHS adds the letters samekh "ס" (for סתומה, setumah: "closed portion") and "פ" (for פתוחה, petuchah: "open portion") into the text to indicate blank spaces in the Leningrad Codex, which divide the text into sections.

One more difference to the Leningrad Codex is the book order, the Books of Chronicles have been moved to the end as it appears in common Hebrew bibles, even though it precedes Psalms in the codex.

Contents

The  BHS is composed of the three traditional divisions of the Hebrew Scriptures: the Torah (תורה "instruction"), Neviim (נבאים "prophets"), and the Ketuvim (כתבים "writings").

In the margins are Masoretic notes. These are based on the codex, but have been heavily edited to make them more consistent and easier to understand.  Even so, whole books have been written to explain these notes themselves. Some of the notes are marked sub loco ("in this place"), meaning that there appears to be some problem, often that they contradict the text. The editors never published any explanation of what the problems were, or how they might be resolved.

The sub loco notes do not necessarily explain interesting text variants; they are, in the vast majority, only notes on inaccurate word countings/frequencies. See Daniel S. Mynatt, The Sub Loco Notes in the Torah of Biblia Hebraica Stuttgartensia (Bibal, 1994); Christopher Dost, The Sub-Loco Notes in the Torah of Biblia Hebraica Stuttgartensia (Gorgias, 2016).

Footnotes record possible corrections to the Hebrew text. Many are based on the Samaritan Pentateuch, the Dead Sea Scrolls and on early Bible translations ("versions") such as the Septuagint, Vulgate and Peshitta. Others are conjectural emendations.

Book order

The order of the biblical books generally follows the codex, even for the Ketuvim, where that order differs from most common printed Hebrew bibles. Thus the Book of Job comes after Psalms and before Proverbs, and the Megillot are in the order Ruth, Song of Songs, Ecclesiastes, Lamentations and Esther. The only difference is with Chronicles.

The Torah:
 1. Genesis [בראשית / Bere’shit] (English rendering: "In beginning")
 2. Exodus [שמות / Shemot] (English rendering: "Names")
 3. Leviticus [ויקרא / Vayikera’] (English rendering: "And he called")
 4. Numbers [במדבר / Bamidebar] (English rendering: "In the wilderness")
 5. Deuteronomy [דברים / Devarim] (English rendering: "The words")

The Nevi'im:
 6. Joshua [יהושע / Yehoshua‛]
 7. Judges [שופטים / Shophetim]
 8. Samuel (I & II) [שמואל / Shemuel]
 9. Kings (I & II) [מלכים / Melakhim]
 10. Isaiah [ישעיה / Yesha‛yahu]
 11. Jeremiah [ירמיה / Yiremiyahu]
 12. Ezekiel [יחזקאל / Yekhezq’el]
 13. The Twelve Prophets [תרי עשר]
 a. Hosea [הושע / Hoshea‛]
 b. Joel [יואל / Yo’el]
 c. Amos [עמוס / Amos]
 d. Obadiah [עובדיה / ‛Ovadyah]
 e. Jonah [יונה / Yonah]
 f. Micah [מיכה / Mikhah]
 g. Nahum [נחום / Nakhum]
 h. Habakkuk [חבקוק /Havaquq]
 i. Zephaniah [צפניה / Tsephanyah]
 j. Haggai [חגי / Khagai]
 k. Zechariah [זכריה / Zekharyah]
 l. Malachi [מלאכי / Mal’akhi]

The Ketuvim
 The Sifrei Emet, the poetic books:
 14. Psalms [תהלים / Tehilim]
 15. Job [איוב / ’Iyov]
 16. Proverbs [משלי / Mishlei]
 The Five Megillot or "Five Scrolls":
 17. Ruth [רות / Ruth]
 18. Song of Songs [שיר השירים / Shir Hashirim]
 19. Ecclesiastes [קהלת / Qoheleth]
 20. Lamentations [איכה / Eikhah]
 21. Esther [אסתר / Esther]

 The rest of the "Writings":
 22. Daniel [דניאל / Dani’el]
 23. Ezra-Nehemiah [עזרא ונחמיה / ‛Ezra’ veNekhemiah]
 24. Chronicles (I & II) [דברי הימים / Diverei Hayamim]

Biblia Hebraica Stuttgartensia: A Reader's Edition
In September 2014 an edition of the BHS called Biblia Hebraica Stuttgartensia: A Reader's Edition (abbreviated as the BHS Reader) was published by the German Bible Society and Hendrickson Publishers. This edition features the same Hebrew text as the regular BHS, but without the Masora on the side margins and with a "Lexical and Grammatical Apparatus" on the bottom of the page replacing the critical apparatus of the BHS.

It was done as a six-year project by Donald R. Vance (Oral Roberts University), George Athas (Moore Theological College) and Yael Avrahami (Oranim Academic College).

The edition defines an English translation to every word in the text: words that occur 70 times or more are listed in a glossary in the back of the book, and words that occur fewer than 70 times are listed in the apparatus. The translations were mostly taken out of the Hebrew and Aramaic Lexicon of the Old Testament, but also from DCH  and the Brown–Driver–Briggs.

Alongside with the translations it features a grammatical parsing of the words encoded in a system of abbreviations (e.g. an introductory example in the book states that the word "והקריבו" from  has the note "Hr10s0 קרב" in the apparatus which means that the word is a "Hiphil suffix conjugation third masculine singular verb with a wāv retentive and a third masculine singular pronominal suffix of the root קרב"). It also has a 50-page appendix listing paradigm-tables for strong and weak verbal roots and noun suffixes.

The BHS Reader follows a tradition of "reader's editions" of Bibles in the original languages. In March 2008 Zondervan published a similar edition done by A. Philip Brown II and Bryan W. Smith from Bob Jones University called A Reader's Hebrew Bible which is based on Westminster Leningrad Codex 4.10, virtually identical to the BHS. Their translations in the apparatus are based on the same dictionaries (with a threshold of 100 occurrences for glossary or apparatus translations instead of 70 in the BHS Reader) and a simpler parsing system.

Criticism 
The bible scholar Emanuel Tov has criticised BHS somewhat for having errors, and for correcting errors in later editions without informing the reader.

See also 
 List of Hebrew Bible manuscripts
 Hebrew University Bible Project
 Hebrew Bible: A Critical Edition
 Biblia Hebraica Quinta
 Stuttgart Vulgate
 Hebrew Old Testament Text Project

Notes

References

Literature 
BHS editions
 Biblia Hebraica Stuttgartensia, Standard Edition, 
 Biblia Hebraica Stuttgartensia, Pocket Book Edition, 
 Biblia Hebraica Stuttgartensia, Study Edition (paperback), 
 Biblia Hebraica Stuttgartensia, Wide-Margin Edition, 
 Biblia Sacra Utriusque Testamenti Editio Hebraica et Graeca (with Novum Testamentum Graece), 

About the BHS
 Kelley, Page H, Mynatt, Daniel S and Crawford, Timothy G: The Masorah of Biblia Hebraica Stuttgartensia: Eerdmans, 1998
 Mynatt, Daniel S: The Sub Loco Notes in the Torah of Biblia Hebraica Stuttgartensia: Bibal Press, 1994
 Wonneberger, R: Understanding BHS: Biblical Institute Press, 1984
 Würthwein, Ernst: The Text of the Old Testament, an Introduction to the Biblia Hebraica (2nd edition): SCM Press, 1995
 Introduction to the Massoretico-Critical Edition of the Hebrew Bible by C.D. Ginsburg

External links 

 Official Biblia Hebraica Stuttgartensia text on www.academic-bible.com
"The Biblia Hebraica Stuttgartensia" on www.academic-bible.com

1977 non-fiction books
Hebrew Bible versions and translations